Chu-yuan (C. Y.) Lee (born 30 December 1938) is a Taiwanese architect born in Guangdong, Republic of China. He received his bachelor's degree from National Cheng Kung University (Tainan) and his master's from Princeton University in the US. He directed the design of Taipei 101, the world's tallest skyscraper at the time of completion, in 2004.

List of major designs

Taiwan
Hung Kuo Building, Taipei, 1989.
Asia Plaza Building, Taipei, 1990.
Grand 50 Tower, Kaohsiung, Taiwan's tallest building from 1992 to 1993.
Far Eastern Plaza I & II, Taipei, 1994.
85 Sky Tower, Kaohsiung, Taiwan's tallest building from 1997 to 2004.
The Splendor Hotel Taichung, Taichung, 1997.
Lihpao Land, Taichung, 1998.
Chung Tai Chan Monastery, Puli, Nantou, 2001.
New Chien-Cheng Circle, Taipei, 2003.
Taipei 101, Taipei, Taiwan's tallest building since 2004, and the tallest skyscraper in the world from 2004 to 2010.
Glory Tower, Keelung, 2007.
Taipei Bus Station, Taipei, 2009.
Farglory Financial Center, Taipei, 2012.
Farglory THE ONE, Kaohsiung, 2020.
New Kinpo Group Headquarters, Taipei, 2026.

China
Post & Telecommunications Center, Tianjin, 1998.
Yuda International Trade Center, Zhengzhou, 1999.
Fangyuan Mansion, Shenyang, 2001.
Jinsha Plaza, Shenyang, 2001.
Ten-faced Puxian Stupa on Jinding, Mount Emei, 2006
Pangu 7 Star Hotel, Beijing, 2008

See also
Taipei 101
C. P. Wang – C. Y. Lee's architect partner.

References

External links

C. Y. Lee Architects Office Official Website
Emporis – List of major designs of C.Y. Lee & partners

1938 births
Living people
Taiwanese Buddhists
Affiliated Senior High School of National Taiwan Normal University alumni
National Cheng Kung University alumni
Princeton University School of Architecture alumni
Taiwanese architects
Artists from Guangdong
Taiwanese people from Guangdong
Chinese architects